Listed below are the dates and results for the 2006 FIFA World Cup qualification first round for Oceania.

Participating teams 
The below 10 teams were divided in two groups of five teams each, and played against each other once. The two teams with most points in each group advanced to the Second Round.

New Caledonia was not a member of FIFA at the time of the draw, and only joined FIFA when its participation in the First Round, and in the 2006 World Cup qualifications, had ended.

Matches

Group 1 
All matches were held in Honiara, Solomon Islands (UTC+11)

 Group 2 All games were held in Apia, Samoa''

Goalscorers
There were 96 goals scored in 20 matches, for an average of 4.8 goals per match.

References 

1
2004
qual